The table below shows the eighteen tallest buildings in Jackson, Mississippi, United States.

The two tallest buildings in the state are the  Beau Rivage Hotel and the  IP Casino Hotel, both located in Biloxi.

See: List of tallest buildings in Mississippi.

Tallest buildings

References

Tallest skyscrapers in Jackson
Capital Towers

Jackson, Miss
Tallest in Jackson